This is a list of notable buildings of the Fraternal Order of Eagles.  The Eagles have a significant built legacy in a number of cities and towns across the United States.  The Eagles were founded in Seattle, Washington.

in the United States 
''(by state then city or town)

References

Fraternal Order of Eagles